Opel used the straight-6 engine configuration for many years. Opel used two straight-6 engines prior to the better-known CIH engine family.

Moonlight

The Opel Moonlight roadster was the first Opel vehicle with a straight-6. It used a  six in 1933. It was a 12-valve engine with a very-undersquare  bore and stroke, typical for the time.

Kapitän

The 1956 Opel Kapitän was the next vehicle from the company with a straight-6 engine. This was a  unit with 12 overhead valves.

See also
 List of GM engines

References

Straight-six engines
Opel engines
Gasoline engines by model